Toongabbie Creek, an urban watercourse that is part of the Parramatta River catchment, is located in Greater Western Sydney, New South Wales, Australia.

Course and features

Although only a small portion of Toongabbie Creek is contained within the Blacktown local government area, much of its sub-catchment, including the Blacktown and Lalor creeks and their associated tributaries are within the City of Blacktown. In 2005, the Toongabbie Creek catchment area was rated as the highest polluting catchment out of the twenty-two catchments in Blacktown. Much of the creek is channeled in a concrete drain; and domestic garbage is often scattered along the creek's banks. Prior to April 2015, the creek was dammed at many places by fallen trees, and the rapids at Mons Road were not visible. The stagnant water in the dams was bubbly. After the rain in April 2015, which caused a flood that damaged infrastructure at Parramatta,  most of the dead trees were cleaned away and the rocks at Mons Road are now exposed.

Toongabbie Creek is transversed by the Cumberland Highway; the Westlink M7 and M2 Hills Motorway at their interchange; and the Old Windsor Road.

The land adjacent to the Parramatta River and its tributaries, including the Toongabbie Creek, was occupied for many thousands of years by the Burramattagal, Toongagal, Wallumattagal, Wangal, and Wategora Aboriginal peoples. They used the river as an important source of food and a place for trade.

See also 

 Rivers of New South Wales

References

External links
 Upper Parramatta River Catchment Trust webpage
 
 
 

Creeks and canals of Sydney
Parramatta River